Tabara may refer to:

Places
Tabăra (disambiguation), three places in Romania and Moldova
Tábara, a town in Spain
Tabara, Togo
Tabara, Estonia, village in Estonia

People with the surname
Enrique Tábara, Latin American painter
Michal Tabara, Czech tennis player
, Japanese artistic gymnast and freestyle skier

See also 
Tabora

Japanese-language surnames